Fabiola Villalobos Morales (born 13 March 1998) is a Costa Rican international footballer who plays as a forward for the Costa Rica women's national football team. She appeared in two matches for Costa Rica at the 2018 CONCACAF Women's Championship.

References

1998 births
Living people
Costa Rican women's footballers
Costa Rica women's international footballers
Women's association football forwards